The Vancouver general strike which took place on 2 August 1918, was the first general strike in Canadian history. There had been talks of organizing a general strike for quite some time due to federal conscription, censorship of socialist publications, and workers' demands for higher wages. War-time inflation reduced real income profoundly and throughout the First World War Vancouver shipbuilders experienced a labour shortage. Numerous government policies had suppressed the work of labour activists such as strikes, lockouts and certain presses being banned. Workers were also inspired by factors such as the Bolshevik Revolution the previous year and the rising cost of living. The strike was eventually organized as a one-day political protest after the killing of draft evader and labour activist Albert "Ginger" Goodwin on 27 July. He had previously called for a general strike in case any worker was drafted against their will.

The strike was met with violence from returned soldiers who had been mobilized and supplied with vehicles to storm the Labour Temple at 411 Dunsmuir Street (the present-day 411 Seniors Centre). Some opposition claimed the strike was a product of a Bolshevik conspiracy. Three hundred men ransacked the offices of the Vancouver Trades and Labour Council (VTLC).  After attempting to throw VTLC secretary, Victor Midgely, out of a window, the soldiers forced him and a longshoreman to kiss the Union Jack. A woman working in the office was also badly bruised when she prevented Midgely from being thrown out the window. Prominent suffragette and member of the Vancouver Trades and Labour Council, Helena Gutteridge, was also at the scene.

Strike leaders could point to the vote by VTLC delegates that supported the strike 117 to 1. After the strike, in response to opposition from the business and middle class, all the strike leaders resigned. Nearly all were re-elected in the ensuing election, demonstrating widespread support for the general strike among organized workers. 

Although the strike-call was province-wide, it was only in the city of Vancouver that it reached general strike proportions. Numerous other strikes took place in the city that year, and the general strike was as much a show of labour strength as it was a political protest over Goodwin's death. At the time, the strike was controversial; some saw Goodwin as a martyr for the labour movement while others saw the strike as a betrayal of Canadian ideals. Although only one day in duration, the strike was an important marker in the Canadian labour revolt that peaked with the Winnipeg General Strike the following year. A 1919 Vancouver strike in sympathy with Winnipeg is still the longest general strike in Canadian history.

References

Vancouver general strike
Vancouver general strike
Vancouver General Strike, 1918
General strikes in Canada
History of Vancouver
Labour disputes in British Columbia
Riots and civil disorder in Canada
August 1918 events